SS Benjamin F. Coston was a Liberty ship built in the United States during World War II. She was named after Benjamin F. Coston, a US Navy officer and scientist. Coston was the chief scientist at the Washington Navy Yard, and is credited with inventing the Coston Signal Flare.

Construction 
Benjamin F. Coston was laid down on 31 July 1944, under a Maritime Commission (MARCOM) contract, MC hull 2318, by J.A. Jones Construction, Panama City, Florida; and launched on 6 September 1944.

History
She was allocated to Union Sulphur & Oil Co., Inc., 23 September 1944. On 27 October 1945, she struck a mine while sailing to Genoa, Italy. On 14 May 1946, she was laid up in the National Defense Reserve Fleet, Hudson River Reserve Fleet, Jones Point, New York.

She was reallocated to Union Sulphur & Oil Co. Inc., 10 July 1946, 28 March 1947, and 15 August 1947, before being placed in the National Defense Reserve Fleet, Wilmington, North Carolina, 21 September 1947.

She was sold for scrapping, 9 July 1964, to Imperial Salvage Corp., for $48,620. She was withdrawn from the fleet, 8 October 1964.

References

Bibliography 

 
 
 
 

 

Liberty ships
Ships built in Panama City, Florida
1944 ships
Hudson River Reserve Fleet
Wilmington Reserve Fleet